You is the fourth album released by Juju under label Sony Music Associated Records.

Track listing

References 

2011 albums
Japanese-language albums
Juju (singer) albums
Onenation albums